The 2003 European Grand Prix (formally the 2003 Allianz Grand Prix of Europe) was a Formula One motor race held on 29 June 2003 at the Nürburgring, Nürburg, Germany. It was the ninth race of the 2003 Formula One season. The 60-lap race was won Ralf Schumacher driving in a Williams car. Juan Pablo Montoya, also driving for Williams finished second, with Rubens Barrichello third in a Ferrari.

Race report

Approximately 123,000 people attended the race. For 25 laps of the European Grand Prix, Kimi Räikkönen looked set to win from his first pole position and regain his championship lead. Then his McLaren’s Mercedes engine broke down and instead it was Ralf Schumacher who came through to score his first win of the year.

Having taken pole, Räikkönen soon built a lead over Ralf Schumacher. He was nine seconds clear when he made his first refuelling stop on the 16th lap, with Michael Schumacher another ten seconds further back. Ralf led briefly for Williams and ran until lap 21 before pitting, but this was still insufficient to keep Räikkönen out of the lead. Ralf Schumacher was still 4.8 seconds behind when the Räikkönen's Mercedes engine blew up, making him the first retirement of the race.

On the 43rd lap Juan Pablo Montoya and Michael Schumacher collided while fighting for second place. Montoya had gradually reeled in Schumacher until they were side-by-side on the rundown to the Dunlop Kurve. Schumacher ran up the kerb and tagged Montoya’s Williams as it passed the German's Ferrari for second place. As Schumacher spun and sat stranded, his Ferrari’s rear wheels spinning in the gravel, Montoya continued. By the time three marshals and fireman pushed the Ferrari from its dangerous spot on the corner’s apex, Schumacher was down to sixth.

“Michael was quick on the straights, but in the corners he was very slow,” said Montoya. “He was on the inside and I was on the outside. I thought I gave him plenty of room. I wasn’t going to give him all the track, but I thought it was all right.”

Schumacher agreed that Montoya had given him enough room and after a stewards’ enquiry, no action was taken. Ferrari’s Ross Brawn was not content with the situation, but Williams technical director Patrick Head remarked that, had Montoya been penalised, it would effectively have been a declaration that overtaking was no longer allowed in Formula One racing.

Then, on the 57th lap, McLaren's David Coulthard suddenly had to swerve around Fernando Alonso approaching the chicane, and spun into retirement. “Alonso braked ten metres earlier than he had the lap before,” said Coulthard. “He was dealing inconsistently with problems, as his rear tyres looked completely worn out. But I just got caught out.” The Spaniard continued, and was very nearly caught on the final lap by the recovering world champion. The stewards investigated the incident after a report was filed to them by the FIA race director Charlie Whiting. They spoke to both Alonso and Coulthard and members of their respective teams. After a review of telemetry and video data, no driver was imposed a penalty.

Williams’ haul of points from a race in which McLaren went home with none moved them up into second place in the constructors’ championship. Sir Frank Williams was careful to play down talk of a championship challenge for his team. But with Ferrari only 13 points ahead, everyone within the team believed that they had a chance of challenging before the season was over.

Classification

Qualifying

Race

Championship standings after the race 

Drivers' Championship standings

Constructors' Championship standings

Note: Only the top five positions are included for both sets of standings.

References

European Grand Prix
European Grand Prix
European Grand Prix
European Grand Prix